

Canadian Football News in 1922
The Edmonton Eskimos were renamed the Edmonton Elks.

Regular season

Final regular season standings
Note: GP = Games Played, W = Wins, L = Losses, T = Ties, PF = Points For, PA = Points Against, Pts = Points
*Bold text means that they have clinched the playoffs

League Champions

Grey Cup playoffs
Note: All dates in 1922

SRFU Playoff

Regina wins the SRFU championship.

I.C.R.F.L final

Queen's advances to the East Final.

Western semifinal

Edmonton advances to the West Final.

Western final

Edmonton advances to the Grey Cup.

East semifinal

Toronto Argonauts advance to the East Final.

East final

Queen's advances to the Grey Cup.

Playoff bracket

Grey Cup Championship

1922 Toronto Globe Eastern All-Stars
NOTE: During this time most players played both ways, so the All-Star selections do not distinguish between some offensive and defensive positions.
FW - Gordon Duncan, University of Toronto
HB - Pep Leadley, Queen's University
HB - Warren Snyder, University of Toronto
HB - Lionel Conacher, Toronto Argonauts
QB - Johnny Evans, Queen's University
C  - Lionel Shoebottom, Toronto Parkdale
G  - ???, University of Toronto
G  - Harold Pugh, Toronto Argonauts
T  - Doug Ambridge, McGill University
T  - ???, Montreal AAA
E  - Cap Fear, Toronto Argonauts
E  - Bud Thomas, Ottawa Rough Riders

References

 
Canadian Football League seasons